Redhawk may refer to:

 Ruger Redhawk, a large frame revolver
 Ruger Super Redhawk, a line of double action magnum revolvers
 RedHawk Linux, a real-time operating system used by Concurrent Computer Corporation in the early 2000s

See also
 Red Hawk (disambiguation)
 Redhawks (disambiguation)